Gordon Hamilton may refer to:

 Gordon Hamilton (rugby union) (born 1964), retired rugby union player
 Gordon Hamilton (composer) (born 1982), Australian composer and conductor
 Gordon Hamilton (Australian footballer) (1920-1941), Australian rules footballer
 Gordon Hamilton (dancer) (1918-1959), Australian ballet dancer
 Gordon Hamilton (scientist) (died 2016), scientist who studied glaciers